The Argentine legislative elections of 1926 were held on 7 March. Voters chose their legislators and numerous governors, and with a turnout of 49.2%.

Background

Elections in 1926 became a prologue to the presidential campaign which was to be held in April 1928. This was made inevitable by former President Hipólito Yrigoyen's decision to run for the office he had held from 1916 to 1922, when policy differences with the conservative wing of the UCR, as well as his removal of 18 governors by decree, created the Antipersonalist faction. 

Yrigoyen's own popularity, the cohesiveness of his majority faction, and disunity among the "dissident" UCR groups (which were originally five, and had become ten by 1926) sustained the aging populist as the country's paramount politician after disappointing mid-term results in 1924. 
  
The 1926 results themselves further eroded the pro-Yrigoyen UCR's majority in the Lower House, while solidifying dissident UCR control in Entre Ríos, Mendoza, San Juan, Santa Fe, and Santiago del Estero Provinces. Yrigoyen's allies, who won in three, smaller northwestern provinces, carried Buenos Aires Province, as well the City of Buenos Aires, however. These latter were defining victories in Yrigoyen's preparations for 1928, and more so because a key ally, Buenos Aires Governor José Luis Cantilo, would be succeeded by Valentín Vergara — an even closer ally.

Given that Conservatives, Democratic Progressives, and Socialists were unable to gain traction as alternatives to the dueling UCRs, these results compelled the Antipersonalists' chief voice, Interior  Minister Gallo, to petition the President for Vergara's removal. Alvear, however, refused, and Gallo, who acrimoniously resigned, handed Yrigoyen a powerful issue as the nation geared for the 1928 campaign.

Results

References 

1926
Argentina
1926 in Argentina
March 1926 events